Choi Hyun-Yeon (Hangul: 최현연, born 16 April 1984) is a South Korean footballer. He previously plays for Navbahor.

External links 
 

1984 births
Living people
Association football midfielders
South Korean footballers
South Korean expatriate footballers
South Korean expatriate sportspeople in China
Expatriate footballers in China
Jeju United FC players
Pohang Steelers players
Gyeongnam FC players
Zhejiang Yiteng F.C. players
K League 1 players
Chinese Super League players